Brad Hill is an Australian Paralympic athlete.  At the 1988 Seoul Games, he won a gold medal in the Men's 200 m C7 event and a silver medal in the Men's 400 m C7 event.

References

Paralympic athletes of Australia
Athletes (track and field) at the 1988 Summer Paralympics
Paralympic gold medalists for Australia
Paralympic silver medalists for Australia
Living people
Medalists at the 1988 Summer Paralympics
Year of birth missing (living people)
Paralympic medalists in athletics (track and field)
Australian male sprinters